Julieta Egurrola (born 13 June 1953, Mexico City) is a Mexican actress. She studied acting at Centro Universitario de Teatro and has participated in more than 41 theater plays.

Filmography

Film
 El infierno tan temido (1975)
 María de mi corazón (1979)
 La mujer perfecta (1979) – Claudia
 Enroque (1981)
 Un frágil retorno (1981)
 Las apariencias engañan (1983)
 Cartas a Maria Teresa (1989)
 Revenge (1990)
 Mina (1992)
 Principio y fin (1993) – Ignacia Botero
 Jonás y la ballena rosada (1995)
 Profundo carmesí (1996) – Juanita Norton
 Fin de juego (1998)
 El evangelio de las Maravillas (1998) – Tomasa's mother
 Crónica de un desayuno (1999) – Seño Fonda
 En el país de no pasa nada (2000) – Elena Lascuráin
 Otilia Rauda (2001) – Otilia's mother
 Santos peregrinos (2004) – Juanita
 Efectos secundarios (2006) – Carola
 Familia tortuga (2006)
 Revotando (2007)
 Amor letra por letra (2008) – Consuelo
 Pentimento (2009)

Television 

 Mamá campanita (1978)
 Pasiones encendidas (1978)
 El cielo es para todos (1979)
 El árabe (1980) – Diana
 Bodas de odio (1983) – Josefina de Icaza
 Tú o nadie (1985) – Meche
 Martín Garatuza (1986) – Sarmiento
 La pobre señorita Limantour (1987)
 Quinceañera (1987) – Carmen Fernández
 Encadenados (1988) – Jacinta
 Dulce desafío (1989) – Refugio
 Yo compro esa mujer (1990) – Isabel de Marín
 Atrapada (1991) – Fina
 Triángulo (1992) – Ana Linares de Villafranca
 Prisionera de amor (1994) – Flavia Monasterios
 El vuelo del águila (1994) – Luisa Romero Rubio
 Si Dios me quita la vida (1995) – Antonieta
 La culpa (1996) – Irma
 Señora (1998) – Dolores / Victoria Santacruz
 Háblame de amor (1999) – Laura de Toledo
 La calle de las novias (2000) – Diana de Mendoza
 La duda (2002) – Teresa
 Cara o cruz (2002) – Matilde Sosa de Alcántara
 Mirada de mujer: El regreso (2003)
 La Heredera (2004) – Dulce Regina Sergio Torres
 Machos (2005) – Valentina Fernández
 Montecristo (2006) – Sara
 Vivir por ti (2008) – Mercedes
 La Loba (2010) – La Güera
 Emperatriz (2011) – Perfecta Jurado
 Los Rey (2012) – Julia's mother
 Mujeres de negro (2016) – Isabella de Zamora

References

External links

Living people
Actresses from Mexico City
Mexican film actresses
Mexican telenovela actresses
Mexican television actresses
1953 births